Norton Township may refer to:

Norton Township, Kankakee County, Illinois
Norton Township, Jefferson County, Kansas
Norton Township, Winona County, Minnesota
Norton Township, Walsh County, North Dakota
Norton Township, Summit County, Ohio

Township name disambiguation pages